is a 2021 role-playing video game developed by Nihon Falcom. The game is a part of the Trails series, itself a part of the larger The Legend of Heroes franchise, and is the first game in the Kuro no Kiseki story arc. It marks the second half of the Trails series and is the first to be set in the Calvard Republic. The game follows Van Arkride, a young man working as a Spriggan, a mix of a bounty hunter and detective. 

Kuro no Kiseki was released in Japan for the PlayStation 4 in September 2021. A port for the PlayStation 5 released in Japan and other Asian regions in July 2022, along with a Windows port in Chinese and Korean. A Japanese Windows port was released in March 2023, with plans to update it later with an English localization.

Gameplay

The story follows a chapter format. In each chapter, the player spends a day in the city of Edith, where he is free to interact with characters and do side missions. When the story progresses, it sends the player to a different place where a new member joins the party. The game has no load times for entering or existing buildings, and generally has a larger overworld than seen in previous games in the series. A first for the series, Kuro no Kiseki features an alignment system based on law, chaos, and mix of the two. While the system does not affect the main story or ending, it unlocks options that allow the player to ally with certain factions at a particular point in the game, triggering unique events and dialogues.

The game's combat system is divided into two modes: real-time action battles similar to Falcom's Ys series and traditional turn-based combat featured in the series' past. The game encourages the player to use both modes, which can be freely switched between outside of boss fights, which are exclusively turn-based.

Plot
Kuro no Kiseki is set in the Calvard Republic in the year 1208. Thanks to postwar reparations, Calvard experiences unprecedented economic growth while continuously dealing with public unrest caused by immigration and new governmental reforms. In a corner of the city of Edith, a young man known as Van Arkride works as a Spriggan in his Arkride Solution Office, which is a mix of a bounty hunter and detective.

One day, Van is approached by Agnes Claudel, a high school student and the daughter of Calvard's new president Roy Gramheart. She asks for his help to find a type of orbment called Oct-Genesis, the last creation of her late great grandfather Claude Epstein, one of the greatest scientists in history. Along the way they are joined by Feri Al-Fayed, a Jaeger of the Khruga clan; Aaron Wei, a performer in Langport; Risette Twinings, an employee of a private military company; Quatre Salision, a pupil of professor Hamilton who is one of professor Epstein's disciples; Judith Ranster, a famous actor who has a secret identity as the Phantom Thief Grimcats and Bergard Zeman (Gunther Barkhorn), Van's mentor and a knight of the Church who was presumed dead. Their search for the Oct-Genesis brings them into Conflict with the terrorist group Almata led by Gerard Dantes. The Arkride Solution Office align themselves with other factions such as the Bracers, the government and even criminal organizations like Ouroboros and Heiyue against Almata, which itself is aided by Garden, a secret organization formed by Ellroy Harwood, the fourth anguis of Ouroboros who combined the remains of the D∴G cult in Crossbell with the remains of the group he formerly belonged to, the Order of the Moonlight Horse. Van also reunites with Elaine Auclair, a bracer who is his childhood friend and former lover and Rene Kincaid, a government secretary who is his and Elaine's childhood friend.

It is revealed that Van has become the host of one of the five demon lords known as Vagrants-Zion when he was young (which allows him to take a monstrous form known as Grendel), as such he became a test subject of the D∴G cult under the supervision of Gerard Dantes who was a member at the time. Using his position in the cult, Gerard claimed the power for himself and escaped the cult's extermination, he then took over the leadership of Almata to spread fear and strengthen the demonic power. It is also revealed that Gerard is actually a descendant of the Eldarion family, Calvard's fallen monarchy.

Van and his team face and kill Gerard, but he and other deceased members of Almata are revived by one of his subordinates named Melchior. The Spriggans face Gerard again who transforms into a demon, Van takes the demonic power back from him, killing him for good. Giving the last Oct-Genesis they found back to Agnes, Van becomes Vagrants-Zion and imprisons himself in another plain to save humanity, but his team, with the help of his orbment's artificial intelligence Mare, reach Van's prison realm, save him and together, defeat the demon lord.

Development and release
Kuro no Kiseki is considered to be the start of the second half of the series' narrative, starting the Kuro no Kiseki story arc that currently consists of itself and a sequel, Kuro no Kiseki II – Crimson Sin. It features a new proprietary game engine by Falcom that replaced the PhyreEngine used in the Trails of Cold Steel series. Kuro no Kiseki was released for the PlayStation 4 in Japan on September 30, 2021. A port for the PlayStation 5 was released in Japan and other Asian regions on July 28, 2022, along with a Windows port in Chinese and Korean.

Nihon Falcom intends for the game to be localized in English. A fan translation group released a spreadsheet and overlay program for the game, but received a cease-and-desist removal order by NIS America in August 2022 after an unofficial patch that could directly insert the English text into the game was made. NIS America later released a Japanese Windows port on March 1, 2023, with plans to update it later with an English localization.

Reception
In Japan, the PlayStation 4 version of Kuro no Kiseki was the highest selling physical game of its release week, selling an estimated 50,100 copies. It remained on the weekly top 30 sales chart for another two weeks, reaching a total of 58,300 physical copies sold. The PlayStation 5 version debuted at the bottom of the chart, selling 2,400 copies.

Notes

References

External links
  

2021 video games
The Legend of Heroes
Nihon Falcom games
PlayStation 4 games
PlayStation 5 games
Role-playing video games
Single-player video games
Kuro no Kiseki
Video games about cults
Video games developed in Japan
Windows games